CARMONETTE (Combined ARms Computer MOdel) is a 1953 mainframe computer Monte Carlo simulation developed by the US Operations Research Office (ORO). While the first computerized simulation of conventional combat was "Air Defense Simulation", developed by the Army Operations Research Office at Johns Hopkins University in 1948, the Carmonette series was a later variant of the genre, featuring ground combat at the levels of the individual soldier and company. The principal architect of Carmonette was Richard E. Zimmerman.

It was followed by CARMONETTE II which included infantry (1960–1965); CARMONETTE III which added armed helicopter support (1966–1970); also CARMONETTE IV added communications and night vision.

Piero Scaruffi described it as the  first digital computer game.

References 

Mainframe games
Military combat simulators